The 2022–23 FC St. Gallen season is the club's 144th season in existence and the 11th consecutive season in the top flight of Swiss football. In addition to the domestic league, FC St. Gallen will participate in this season's edition of the Swiss Cup. The season covers the period from 1 July 2022 to 30 June 2023.

Players

First-team squad

Out on loan

Transfers

In

Out

Pre-season and friendlies

Competitions

Overview

Swiss Super League

League table

Results summary

Results by round

Matches

Swiss Cup

Statistics

Goalscorers

References

FC St. Gallen seasons
St. Gallen